The KMT-5M is a Soviet tank mounted mechanical mine clearing device in the KMT series that is designed to disable anti-tank mines by plowing up or mechanically breaking them from the lines in front of tank tracks.  It was first introduced in the 1960s.  The device can be mounted to T-54/55, T-62 and T-64 tanks. The plow has nowadays been mostly replaced by the modern version KMT-7 that can be installed to T-72, T-80 and T-90 series of tanks. It was however recently copied by the Romanians in their D-5M mine clearing system.

Technical specifications 
Operating speed: 6–12 km/h
Cleared lane width: 0.81 m x 2
Depth of clearance: 0.1 m
Install time: 30-45 min
Removal time: 8-13 min
Weight: 7.5 t (m)

References 

Mine warfare countermeasures
Tanks of the Soviet Union